Roger Dee Hambright (born March 26, 1949 in Sunnyside, Washington) is a former Major League Baseball pitcher. In 18 career games, he had a 3-1 record with a 4.39 ERA. He batted and threw right-handed.

Hambright was drafted by the Yankees in the 67th round of the 1967 amateur draft.

External links
Baseball Reference.com page

1949 births
Living people
American expatriate baseball players in Mexico
Baseball players from Washington (state)
Fort Lauderdale Yankees players
Indios de Ciudad Juárez (minor league) players
Johnson City Yankees players
Kinston Eagles players
Major League Baseball pitchers
Manchester Yankees players
Mexican League baseball pitchers
New York Yankees players
Syracuse Chiefs players
West Haven Yankees players